The 1939–40 Maltese First Division was the 29th season of top-tier football in Malta.  It was contested by 6 teams, and Sliema Wanderers F.C. won the championship.

League standings

Championship tie-breaker
With both Sliema Wanderers and St. George's level on 16 points, a play-off match was conducted to decide the champion.

Results

References
Malta - List of final tables (RSSSF)

Maltese Premier League seasons
Malta
Football
Football